Giuseppe Bologna (1634 – 2 August 1697) was a Roman Catholic prelate who served as Archbishop of Capua (1691–1697) and Archbishop of Benevento (1674–1680).

Biography
Giuseppe Bologna was born in Naples, Italy in 1634. On 12 March 1674, he was appointed during the papacy of Pope Clement X as Archbishop of Benevento. He resigned in 1680. On 26 November 1691, he was appointed during the papacy of Pope Innocent XII as Archbishop of Capua. He served as Archbishop of Capua until his death on 2 August 1697.

Episcopal succession

See also 
Catholic Church in Italy

References

External links and additional sources
 (for Chronology of Bishops) 
 (for Chronology of Bishops) 
 (for Chronology of Bishops) 
 (for Chronology of Bishops) 

17th-century Italian Roman Catholic archbishops
Bishops appointed by Pope Clement X
Bishops appointed by Pope Innocent XII
1634 births
1697 deaths